The PLK Best Defender is an annual award that is handed out in the Polish top basketball league, the PLK. The award is given to the best defensive player in a given PLK regular season. The first Best Defender Award was handed out in the 2005–06 season, to Tomas Masiulis.

Winners

References

External links
Polska Liga Koszykówki - Official Site 
Polish League at Eurobasket.com

Best Defender